Paraspõllu Nature Reserve is a nature reserve which is located in Harju County, Estonia.

The area of the nature reserve is 479 ha.

The protected area was founded in 1999 to protect valuable habitat types and threatened species in Suursoo village (Rae Parish) and in Igavere and Pikavere village (both in former Raasiku Parish).

References

Nature reserves in Estonia
Geography of Harju County